Genryusai may refer to:

Maki Genryusai, a female character in the Final Fight and Street Fighter video game series
Shigekuni Yamamoto-Genryūsai, a male character featured in the manga and anime series Bleach